Ekspress-AM7 ( meaning Express-AM7) is a Russian communications satellite operated by the Russian Satellite Communications Company (RSCC).

Satellite description 
EADS Astrium, was contracted in March 2012, which had become part of Airbus Defence and Space by the time of the satellite's launch, constructed Ekspress-AM7, which was based on the Eurostar-3000 satellite bus. The satellite carried 62 transponders: 24 operating in the C-band of the electromagnetic spectrum, 36 in the Ku-band and 2 in the L-band. It is a replacemt for Ekspress-AM1.

Launch 
Khrunichev was contracted to launch Ekspress-AM7, using a Proton-M / Briz-M launch vehicle - the same configuration that had failed to deploy the similar Ekspress-AM4 and Ekspress-AM4R. The launch took place from Site 200/39 at the Baikonur Cosmodrome, at 22:05:00 UTC on 18 March 2015. The satellite was deployed into the planned geostationary transfer orbit (GTO).

See also 

 Ekspress

References 

Spacecraft launched in 2015
Ekspress satellites
2015 in Russia
Satellites using the Eurostar bus